Quicksands is a 1913 American silent short drama film directed by Allan Dwan. The film stars J. Warren Kerrigan, Charlotte Burton, Vivian Rich, George Periolat, Jack Richardson, Louise Lester, and Charles Morrison

External links

1913 films
1913 drama films
Silent American drama films
American silent short films
American black-and-white films
1913 short films
Films directed by Allan Dwan
1910s American films